Josef Šorm (March 2, 1932 – May 11, 2022) was a Czech volleyball player who competed for Czechoslovakia in the 1964 Summer Olympics.

He was born in Dvůr Králové nad Labem.

In 1964 he was part of the Czechoslovak team which won the silver medal in the Olympic tournament. He played eight matches.

References

External links
 profile

1932 births
2022 deaths
Czech men's volleyball players
Czechoslovak men's volleyball players
Olympic volleyball players of Czechoslovakia
Volleyball players at the 1964 Summer Olympics
Olympic silver medalists for Czechoslovakia
Olympic medalists in volleyball
Medalists at the 1964 Summer Olympics
People from Dvůr Králové nad Labem